The Indonesia International is an international badminton tournament, which is held annually in Indonesia since 1997. It is organized by the Badminton Association of Indonesia. Since 2007, it is graded as the International Challenge, which are level 4 badminton tournaments. Since 2014, there are two different level 4 tournament:  International Challenge and  International Series which held in two different cities.

Host

Past winners

Indonesia International Challenge

Indonesia International Series

Performances by nation

Indonesia International Challenge

Indonesia International Series

See also
 Indonesia Open
 Indonesia Masters
 Indonesia Masters Super 100

References

External links
 Badminton Association of Indonesia

Badminton tournaments in Indonesia
Annual sporting events in Indonesia
1997 establishments in Indonesia
Recurring sporting events established in 1997